Menlo is a city in Guthrie County, Iowa, United States. The population was 345 at the time of the 2020 census. It is part of the Des Moines–West Des Moines Metropolitan Statistical Area.

History
Menlo was laid out in 1869. Menlo was first called "The Switch" and then "Guthrie Switch", but it was finally renamed Menlo in order to prevent confusion with Guthrie Center.

Geography
Menlo is located at  (41.522461, -94.405375).

Demographics

2010 census
As of the census of 2010, there were 353 people, 147 households, and 91 families living in the city. The racial makeup of the city was 97.2% White, 0.3% African American, 0.6% Asian, 0.3% from other races, and 1.7% from two or more races. Hispanic or Latino of any race were 1.4% of the population.

There were 147 households, of which 30.6% had children under the age of 18 living with them, 52.4% were married couples living together, 4.1% had a female householder with no husband present, 5.4% had a male householder with no wife present, and 38.1% were non-families. 34.0% of all households were made up of individuals, and 13.6% had someone living alone who was 65 years of age or older. The average household size was 2.40 and the average family size was 3.10.

The median age in the city was 37.7 years. 26.3% of residents were under the age of 18; 5.1% were between the ages of 18 and 24; 28.3% were from 25 to 44; 25.2% were from 45 to 64; and 15% were 65 years of age or older. The gender makeup of the city was 50.1% male and 49.9% female.

2000 census
As of the census of 2000, there were 365 people, 144 households, and 101 families living in the city. The racial makeup of the city was 98.36% White, and 1.64% from two or more races. Hispanic or Latino of any race were 0.55% of the population.

There were 144 households, out of which 31.3% had children under the age of 18 living with them, 56.3% were married couples living together, 6.3% had a female householder with no husband present, and 29.2% were non-families. 26.4% of all households were made up of individuals, and 13.9% had someone living alone who was 65 years of age or older. The average household size was 2.53 and the average family size was 3.02.

In the city, the population was spread out, with 26.8% under the age of 18, 7.7% from 18 to 24, 27.9% from 25 to 44, 21.6% from 45 to 64, and 15.9% who were 65 years of age or older. The median age was 37 years. For every 100 females, there were 93.1 males. For every 100 females age 18 and over, there were 96.3 males.

The median income for a household in the city was $29,375, and the median income for a family was $31,875. Males had a median income of $27,813 versus $21,058 for females. The per capita income for the city was $17,990. About 5.2% of families and 7.4% of the population were below the poverty line, including 1.2% of those under age 18 and 13.6% of those age 65 or over.

Education
Menlo is within the West Central Valley Community School District. The district was established on July 1, 2001 by the merger of the Stuart-Menlo Community School District and the Dexfield Community School District. The former was established on July 1, 1971 by the merger of the Stuart and Menlo school districts.

Government
Carol Sheldahl was elected mayor in 2022 and will serve until 2024.

References

Cities in Iowa
Cities in Guthrie County, Iowa
Des Moines metropolitan area
1869 establishments in Iowa
Populated places established in 1869